Princess Aurora may refer to:

 Princess Aurora, a character in The Sleeping Beauty by Tchaikovsky
 Princess Aurora (Disney), a character from Disney's Sleeping Beauty (1959 film)
 In Charles Perrault's version of Sleeping Beauty, Sleeping Beauty's daughter is named L'Aurore or Aurora
 Princess Aurora, a very minor fictional Egyptian princess who is mentioned in Jackie Chan Adventures
 Princess Aurora, a main character in the 1980s Japanese animated TV series Starzinger
 Princess Aurora (film), a 2005 South Korean crime film where the stickers of Princess Aurora from Starzinger is involved
 Princess Aurora (TV series), a 2013 South Korean drama series